Andrew Henry may refer to:

Andrew Henry (VC) (1823–1870), English recipient of the Victoria Cross 
Andrew Henry (fur trader) (c. 1775–1832), American fur trader and co-founder of the Rocky Mountain Fur Company

See also